Angel Michael Mathaiya Waruih (born 9 December 2003) is a professional footballer who plays as a central midfielder for  club Brentford. He is a product of the Plymouth Argyle academy and began his professional career with Brentford in 2022.

Career

Plymouth Argyle 
A central midfielder, Waruih began his career in Plymouth Argyle's Advanced Development Centre, before joining the club's academy at the age of 9. He progressed through the academy and was a part of the club's 2018 SuperCupNI Super Vase-winning team. Waruih signed a two-year scholarship deal at the end of the 2019–20 season and was a part of the U18 team which won the 2020–21 EFL Youth Alliance Merit League One title. Waruih won calls into two EFL Trophy squads during the 2021–22 season and made his only senior appearance for the club with a start in a 2–0 group stage defeat to Newport County on 31 August 2021. He was released at the end of the 2021–22 season.

Brentford 
On 24 August 2022, Waruih transferred to the B team at Premier League club Brentford and signed a one-year contract, with a one year option.

Style of play 
Waruih is a deep-lying midfielder and "has the capability to push further forward and play as a number eight too".

Personal life 
Waruih is of Botswanan descent. He attended St Boniface's Catholic College.

Career statistics

References

External links

Angel Waruih at brentfordfc.com

Living people
2003 births
People educated at St Boniface's Catholic College
English people of Botswana descent
English footballers
Association football midfielders
Plymouth Argyle F.C. players
Brentford F.C. players